

Buildings and structures

Buildings
 1080
 Rebuilding of Basilica of St. Sernin, Toulouse begun.
 Construction of Cluny Abbey III in France, begun.
 1081
 Surviving Chora Church in Constantinople completed (begun in 1077).
 Aljafería Palace in Zaragoza, Spain completed (begun in 1065).
 Old Mainz Cathedral destroyed by a fire, marking the beginning of the construction of the building which survives to the modern day.
 1082 – Great Mosque of Tlemcen built in the Almoravid Empire.
 1083 – Surviving Ely Cathedral in England begun.
 1086 – Shwezigon Pagoda in Nyaung-U completed.
 before 1087 – Construction of the Church of Christ Pantepoptes in Constantinople begun.
 1087
 White Tower (Tower of London) in England finished (begun in 1078).
 Basilica di San Nicola in Bari, Apulia, begun.
 1088
 Rebuilding of Cluny Abbey in France begun.
 Eynsford Castle in England built.
 1089 – Romanesque stage of St Albans Cathedral in England completed.

Births
 c. 1081 – Abbot Suger (died 1151), French abbot-statesman and patron of Gothic architecture.

Deaths

References

11th-century architecture
Architecture